Bernasconi might refer to:

People
Bernasconi (surname)
Bernasconi family

Places
Bernasconi, Argentina, a village
Bernasconi Hills (and Pass), a mountain range and pass in Southern California
Bernasconi Institute, a primary school in Buenos Aires
7848 Bernasconi, a minor planet